WXAX-CD, virtual and UHF digital channel 26, is a low-powered, Class A BeIN Sports Xtra-affiliated television station licensed to Clearwater, Florida, United States. The station has been on the air intermittently since January 24, 1990. The station was previously owned by Una Vez Mas Holdings. It was later owned by Northstar Media, which was purchased by HC2 Holdings in 2017. It is licensed to HC2 Station Group LLC.

Currently, only Verizon FiOS and Dish Network offer the channel to Tampa Bay-area subscribers; other systems, such as Spectrum and Xfinity, do not offer this channel.

History
Previously, WXAX-CD was home to SUR (another Spanish network), HTV (Latino music videos), and UATV (general entertainment).

The station was originally licensed and originated in St. Petersburg, then Clearwater, and, finally, Tampa. It is once again licensed in Clearwater, broadcasting from the Riverview antenna farm, directional towards Tampa. The general signal area covers most of Tampa and southwestern Hillsborough County, but barely reaches Pinellas County.

The construction permit was issued on July 3, 1990 under the callsign W26AX. It moved to WXAX-LP on July 22, 1996, and finally to the current WXAX-CD on June 3, 2015.

Digital channels
The station's digital signal is multiplexed:

References

External links

XAX-CD
XAX-CD
Television channels and stations established in 1990
Low-power television stations in the United States
1990 establishments in Florida
Innovate Corp.